The Iloilo City Hall is the official seat of government of the City of Iloilo, Philippines, located in Plaza Libertad, Iloilo City Proper. It is where the Mayor of Iloilo City holds office and the chambers of the Iloilo City Council. It also hosts several offices under the Iloilo City Government.

The new Iloilo City Hall was completed in August 2011 as the replacement for the Old Iloilo City Hall after the city government donated it to the University of the Philippines Visayas, which now serves as the UP Visayas Main Building.

The Iloilo City Hall is the first green building in the Visayas, which features a solar powered air-conditioning system, a rooftop garden, and a rain harvesting area.

Lin-ay sang Iloilo (Lady of Iloilo), an 18-foot bronze statue on top of Iloilo City Hall's dome. The inspiration was drawn from the U.S. Capitol Building in Washington, D.C., where a twenty-foot statue called "The Lady of Freedom" stands as a symbol of "Freedom triumphant in War and Peace." The Lin-ay sang Iloilo characterized prosperity and aspirations of hope and peace.
It was designed by Ed Defensor and cast by Franz Herbich in Cebu Philippines.

In 2021, the 8-story Iloilo City Legislative Building began construction at the back of City Hall, which will be connected by a bridge. It will house the offices of City Councilors. Mayor Jerry Treñas is also pushing for a 7-story multi-parking building near City Hall.

See also 

 Old Iloilo City Hall

References

External links 

 Iloilo City Government – Official website

Buildings and structures in Iloilo City
City and municipal halls in the Philippines
Government buildings completed in 2011
Local government in Iloilo City
21st-century architecture in the Philippines